"The Big Hurt" is a pop song that was a hit for Toni Fisher (billed as "Miss Toni Fisher") in 1959.  The song was written by Wayne Shanklin. "The Big Hurt" is notable because it featured phasing effects which at that time were rare in popular music; DJ Dick Biondi on WKBW would introduce the record as "Toni Fisher's weird one."

Music
The 45 rpm plays in C major, even though on the sheet music (copyright 1959 by Music Productions, Hollywood, CA), the song is in the key of F major.  The time signature is 4/4, and the tempo is indicated as "Moderate Beguine Tempo." The melody begins with a triplet on beats three and four, a motif that appears throughout the song in every second measure. In the other measures, however, the duple meter is reinforced by using eighth notes in the same location, presumably to prevent the tune from becoming a waltz. Although Miss Toni Fisher does use the triplet in her performance on the record, she takes liberties with it and often uses some form of duple rhythm. She also deviates here and there from the notes as written, but well within the usual range employed by singers for expressive purposes.

The main harmonic idea uses the tonic chord alternating with the Neapolitan chord (the flattened supertonic major chord). (The sheet music has an error that occurs three times, but in the chord symbols only, not in actual piano notation: the A flat diminished chord should really be the E major chord with a G# bass note.) The release (contrasting middle section) is in the key of A flat.

Effects
American music industry veterans David S. Gold and Stan Ross, founders of the renowned Gold Star Studios in Hollywood, claim that "The Big Hurt" was the first commercial recording to feature a technique (or effect) now known as flanging. This "jet plane-like" sound effect may also be familiar to those who have listened to long-distance shortwave radio music broadcasts.  (In radio, this effect was the result of multipath interference and varying propagation times.)  To some, the flanging effect made this record sound like a distant shortwave broadcast.

Chart performance
The song went to No. 3 on the Billboard Hot 100 music chart in the United States
as well as going to No.16 on the Hot R&B Sides chart.  Outside the US, "The Big Hurt" went to No. 30 in the UK

Covers
The song was covered numerous times in the mid-to-late-1960s, by artists as diverse as:
Jazz musician Bobby Hutcherson
Scott Walker
Del Shannon's 1966 version reached No. 94 on the Hot 100 (his only charted single on Liberty Records). Shannon's version, produced by Snuff Garrett, also included the phasing effects.
In 1984, the San Francisco-based, dance group, Bearesssense had a minor club hit with their version.
Wes Montgomery recorded this with violins carrying the phase-effect part.

References

1959 singles
1966 singles
Songs written by Wayne Shanklin
Scott Walker (singer) songs
1959 songs